Royal Air Force Bassingbourn or more simply RAF Bassingbourn is a former Royal Air Force station located in Cambridgeshire approximately  north of Royston, Hertfordshire and  south west of Cambridge, Cambridgeshire, England.

During the Second World War it served first as an RAF station and then as a bomber airfield of the Eighth Air Force, of the United States Army Air Forces (USAAF). It remains the home of the Tower Museum Bassingbourn.

Origin and development

Construction
RAF Bassingbourn was constructed by John Laing & Son between 1937 and 1939 in the parishes of Wendy and Bassingbourn immediately to the west of the A14 (now the A1198) road. The site selected was low ground between several tributaries of the River Cam. The area had been long cleared of forest and tended to be swampy and unstable, and because the boggy ground produced a persistent mist over the large meadow the site was considered ideal for airfield camouflage.

The project was begun in April 1937 under the direction of Sir Maurice Laing, with Reginald Silk as the site engineer and John Crowther the site surveyor. Laing then began work pouring concrete foundations for the technical site buildings, communal sites and barracks; the nature of the ground necessitated the rebuilding of several foundations that had sunk into the ground. Roadway cores were built of unusual thickness to prevent crumbling of the pavement.

The technical site was built with permanent, kerbed streets and landscaped. Originally treeless, Bassingbourn was made one of the most attractive RAF stations by the planting of hundreds of plum trees as part of the project.

The runways were originally grass. The Bristol Blenheim light bombers that first used the field were able to operate under the existing conditions, although landings often produced pronounced water splashes, but the weight of heavier bombers tore ruts in the grass surface and limited take-off speeds.

The runways
W & C French Ltd. constructed three concrete runways surfaced with asphalt during the winter of 1941–1942: a  runway aligned southwest to northeast, one of crossing it north–south, and a   runway connecting the northeast ends of the first two. The Class A airfield standard was promulgated by the Air Ministry in August 1942 and the runways at Bassingbourn were immediately extended. Additional perimeter track was added around the bomb store site, which was doubled in area, to reach the west end of the main runway. Ultimately seven miles of taxiway were paved.

Four dispersal areas were also built. Dispersal A was placed in a large field between the technical site and the hamlet of Bassingbourn-North End. Dispersal B was located north and west of the bomb store. Dispersal C was next to the A14 north of the runways and Dispersal D was built in the grand avenue of Wimpole Park, the tree-lined entrance to Wimpole Hall across the A14 from the station. Bombers using this dispersal had to cross the road to marshal for take-off. Ultimately 35 "pan" hardstands and 16 loop hardstands were constructed, able to accommodate 67 bombers.

Bassingbourn made extensive use of camouflage to disguise the location of its runways. Prior to the building of the concrete runways, the strips were painted to blend them into the surrounding pattern of fields, lanes and drainage areas. After conversion to Class A standards, which required extensive clearing and grading of the airfield area, the areas between the runways were camouflaged to resemble agricultural crops.

Royal Air Force use (1938–42)

The airfield was opened in March 1938, with the Hawker Hind light bombers of 104 and 108 Squadrons from RAF Hucknall and RAF Uxbridge moving in on 2 May 1938. In May–June 1938 the two squadrons re-equipped with Bristol Blenheim bombers. In May 1939, the two Bassingbourn-based squadrons were given the new task of converting aircrew from the Royal Air Force Volunteer Reserve onto the Blenheim, the two squadrons supplementing their Blenheims with Avro Anson trainers, and on 1 June 1939, both squadrons were designated Group Training Squadrons for 2 Group, RAF Bomber Command. 

The outbreak of the Second World War in September 1939 saw the two squadrons transfer to 6 Group and move to RAF Bicester in mid-month, being replaced by 215 Squadron, the 3 Group training squadron, equipped with Vickers Wellington, by the end of the month. No. 35 Squadron, the 1 Group training squadron, equipped with Blenheims and Fairey Battles, was also based at Bassingbourn between December 1939 and February 1940. On 8 April 1940, No. 11 Operational Training Unit (OTU) was formed at Bassingbourn, absorbing the Station HQ and 215 Squadron. The new unit had an allocated strength of 54 Wellingtons and 11 Ansons, and used RAF Steeple Morden as a satellite airfield. From December 1941 to February 1942 the OTU operated from Steeple Morden and RAF Tempsford while runways were constructed at Bassingbourn.

The station was attacked on 28 May 1940 by an isolated German raider that dropped 10 bombs, and from March to August 1941, as the easternmost bomber OTU, came under fairly regular attack by German night intruder aircraft. Five Wellingtons of the OTU were shot down by intruders, and on 13 August 1941, a German aircraft dropped four bombs on the airfield, one of which hit a barrack block, killing 10.

On 31 May 1942 aircraft from Bassingbourn participated in the "Thousand Bomber" raid on Cologne. In order to raise this number, Bomber Command employed every aircraft capable of taking to the air, including 25 Wellington bombers from No. 11 OTU (12 of which flew from Bassingbourn, with the other 13 from Steeple Morden). Subsequently aircraft from Bassingbourn took part in several more large raids until the end of September, with 11 OTU moving to RAF Westcott between 28 September and 2 October 1942.

United States Army Air Forces use

Plans for locating United States Army Air Forces heavy bomber groups dated back to before America's entry into the war, when RAF Thurleigh was tentatively designated in November 1941. Initial concepts anticipated that 75 heavy bomb groups would eventually be based in East Anglia and the Huntingdon area in five bombardment wings (later termed air divisions), but the first plan on 24 March 1942, called for 45 groups, with four to be moved to the UK by June. This did not come to pass (of the four groups, only one eventually came to the UK, in 1944) but 75 fields were allocated by the Air Ministry on 10 August 1942 for VIII Bomber Command.

From 19 August 1942 to 25 June 1945, Bassingbourn served as headquarters for the 1st Combat Bombardment Wing of the 1st Bomb Division. It was assigned USAAF designation Station 121.

USAAF Station Units assigned to RAF Bassingbourn were: 
 441st Sub-Depot (VIII Air Force Service Command)
 18th Weather Squadron
 1st Station Complement Squadron
Regular Army Station Units included:
 831st Engineer Aviation Battalion
 204th Quartermaster Company
 1696th Ordnance Supply & Maintenance Company
 863rd Chemical Company (Air Operations)
 982nd Military Police Company
 985th Military Police Company
 2024th Engineer Fire Fighting Platoon
 206th Finance Section
 3rd Mobile Training Unit
 556th Army Postal Unit

91st Bombardment Group (Heavy) 
The 91st Bomb Group, equipped with Boeing B-17 Flying Fortress heavy bombers, moved into Bassingbourn on 14 October 1942. The group had originally been assigned to RAF Kimbolton in Huntingdonshire, but Kimbolton's runways were not strong enough to support B-17 operations, so the 91st moved into Bassingbourn, which as a pre-war RAF station, was relatively well appointed compared to war-built airfields, gaining the nickname "the country club".

The 91st BG was assigned to the 1st Combat Bombardment Wing, which was also based at Bassingbourn from September 1943. The group tail code (after June 1943) was a "Triangle A". Its operational squadrons and fuselage codes were:
 322d Bombardment Squadron (LG)
 323d Bombardment Squadron (OR)
 324th Bombardment Squadron (DF)
 401st Bombardment Squadron (LL)

The airfield remained under RAF administration until 21 April 1943, becoming Army Air Force Station 121. 

The 91st began combat operations from Bassingbourn on 7 November 1942, as one of the four "pioneer" B-17 groups. The group operated primarily as a strategic bombardment organization throughout the war.

The first eight months of operations concentrated against the German submarine campaign, attacking U-boat pens in French ports or construction yards in Germany in 28 of the first 48 missions flown. Secondary targets were Luftwaffe airfields, industrial targets, and marshalling yards.

The 91st BG received a Distinguished Unit Citation for bombing marshalling yards at Hamm on 4 March 1943 in spite of adverse weather and heavy enemy opposition. From the middle of 1943 until the war ended, the Group engaged chiefly in attacks on aircraft factories, aerodromes, and oil facilities. Specific targets included airfields at Villacoublay and Oldenburg, aircraft factories in Oranienburg and Brussels, chemical industries in Leverkusen and Peenemünde, ball-bearing plants in Schweinfurt and other industries in Ludwigshafen, Berlin, Frankfurt, and Wilhelmshaven.

On 11 January 1944 organisations of Eighth AF went into central Germany to attack vital aircraft factories. The 91st BG successfully bombed its targets in spite of bad weather, inadequate fighter cover and severe enemy attack, being awarded a second Distinguished Unit Citation for the performance.

Expanding its operations to include interdictory and support missions, the group contributed to the Battle of Normandy by bombing gun emplacements and troop concentrations near the beachhead area in June 1944 and aided the Saint-Lô breakout by attacking enemy troop positions on 24 and 25 July 1944. The 91st flew tactical bombing missions on the front line near Caen in August 1944 and attacked communications near the battle area during the Battle of the Bulge in December 1944 and January 1945. In support of Operation Varsity, the group assisted the push across the Rhine by striking airfields, bridges and railways near the front line in the spring of 1945.

The 91st Bomb Group continued combat operations until 25 April 1945, flying 340 missions. In terms of its casualties, 197 B-17s failed to return to Bassingbourn, the US Eighth Air Force's highest heavy bomber loss at any USAAF station in the UK.

After V-E Day the group helped to evacuate prisoners of war (POW) from German camps. During June and July 1945, the 91st BG withdrew from Bassingbourn and returned to the United States.

94th Bombardment Group (Heavy) 

VIII Bomber Command quadrupled in size from May 1943 to August to implement the Pointblank Directive. As part of this expansion, RAF Bassingbourn temporarily hosted the flying echelon of the new 94th Bombardment Group from April to May 1943. The 94th flew a few missions from Bassingbourn while under the tutelage of the 91st Bomb Group until moving to RAF Earls Colne on 12 May 1943.

At the same time, VIII Bomber Command proceeded with its plan to organise the groups into "combat wings" which in turn were organised into "bombardment wings" (later "divisions"). The first of these, the 101st Provisional Combat Bomb Wing, commanded by Brigadier General Frank A. Armstrong, Jr., set up its headquarters at Bassingbourn on 16 April 1943. In August Brig. Gen. Robert B. Williams succeeded to command of the 101st PCBW, followed by Brig. Gen. William M. Gross when the organisation was then redesignated 1st Combat Bombing Wing on 13 September 1943.

Hollywood at Bassingbourn
During 1943 RAF Bassingbourn was the focus of a number of media events. The station and its locality were featured in the documentary film Memphis Belle: A Story of a Flying Fortress. One of the Memphis Belle's propellers stands to greet you at the gatehouse on entering the Army Training Regiment.  The airfield and group were also the subject of a series of newspaper articles written by John Steinbeck during the spring and summer of 1943. Captain Clark Gable had temporary duty at Bassingbourn while producing a gunnery film for the USAAF. It also served as the location for the fictional "28th Bomb Group" in the 1950 Humphrey Bogart film Chain Lightning. Away from Hollywood, but still in the movies, RAF Bassingbourn was also the setting for the Airfield-based shots in the 1955 film, The Dambusters, featuring Richard Todd and Michael Redgrave.
In 1986/7 Stanley Kubrick used the barracks as a lot (Paris Island) in his film, Full Metal Jacket. The fake palm trees were there for a few years afterwards.

Postwar Use

RAF Transport Command 
The RAF resumed occupation of Bassingbourn on 26 June 1945, the airfield was officially returned on 10 July 1945. The station became one of the main airfields for long-range transport aircraft. In 1948 and 1949 Avro York, Avro Lancaster and Douglas Dakota aircraft from the base took part in the Berlin Airlift, a massive operation transporting essential commodities to the beleaguered city.

United States Air Forces in Europe 

During the late 1940s, the United States Air Force began rotating deployments of Strategic Air Command (SAC) Boeing B-29 and Boeing B-50 Superfortresses squadrons to the United Kingdom as  "Show of Force" deployments.

With the Soviet blockade of Berlin in 1948 and the subsequent Berlin Airlift, these aircraft began regular deployments to the United Kingdom.  These deployments were designed to send a message to the Soviet Union that despite the Berlin Airlift and Korean War, the United States was prepared to respond with atomic weapons to any Soviet aggression in Western Europe.  Besides Bassingborn, SAC deployed squadrons of bombers to RAF Lakenheath and RAF Marham in Norfolk.

Jurisdiction of Bassingbourn remained with the Royal Air Force.  The United States Air Forces in Europe (USAFE) 7516th Air Support Squadron, 3909th Air Base Group stationed at RAF South Ruislip provided logistical support for these squadrons while in the UK.  These deployments were of a brief nature, beginning in August 1950 and ending in May 1951.   It is unknown if any United States atomic weapons were ever deployed to the United Kingdom.

RAF Bomber Command 
In February 1952, RAF Bassingbourn received its first allocation of English Electric Canberra bombers and became the first jet bomber operational conversion unit (OCU) in the world. Canberras operated from Bassingbourn for 17 years and one of the aircraft is on static display in the Barracks. From 1963 to 1969 the Joint School of Photographic Interpretation was also located there.

On 29 August 1969, the last RAF Commanding Officer, Sqn Ldr A.M. McGregor MBE, turned over the station to the British Army as Bassingbourn Barracks.

Since approximately 1970 the site has retained its RAF links by being the home of 2484 (Bassingbourn) Squadron Air Training Corps.

British Army use 

The former RAF Bassingbourn station was established as Bassingbourn Barracks in January 1970, as the new depot for the Queen's Division. The depot was responsible for training recruits undergoing their basic training before joining a regular battalion. In 1993 the Barracks were re-designated the home of the Army Training Regiment, Bassingbourn and remained as such for nearly 20 years. Bassingbourn Barracks closed as an army training location in August 2012, and re-opened in December 2018 as home to the Mission Training and Mobilisation Centre.

Tower Museum, Bassingbourn
Opened in 1974, the Tower Museum, Bassingbourn was located in the original pre-war air traffic control (ATC) tower (watch office) of RAF Bassingbourn. The museum was focused on the history of the airfield during the Second World War and the men and women of the RAF and USAAF who trained and worked there during that war. Exhibits included photographs, documents and military artefacts about the RAF, USAAF and the 91st Bombardment Group. As of 2021, according to the museum's website, it is permanently closed.

Units Assigned
 Royal Air Force

 United States Army Air Forces
 91st Bombardment Group (14 Oct 1942 – 23 Jun 1945)
 94th Bombardment Group (Apr - 27 May 1943)

 United States Air Force
 353d Bombardment Squadron, 301st Bombardment Group (25 Aug 1950 - Jan 1951)
 341st Bombardment Squadron, 97th Bombardment Group  (4 Dec 1950 - Feb 1951)
 7516th Air Support Squadron (11 Dec 1950 – 16 May 1951)
 38th Strategic Reconnaissance Squadron, 55th Strategic Reconnaissance Wing (Jan - May 1951)
 96th Bombardment Squadron, 2d Bombardment Group USAF (May - Sep 1951)

See also

 Strategic Air Command in the United Kingdom
List of former Royal Air Force stations
List of British Army Barracks

References

Citations

Bibliography
 Andrade, John M. U.S. Military Aircraft designations and Serials since 1909. Earl Shilton, Leicester, UK: Midland Counties Publications, 1979. .
 
 Bishop, Cliff T. Fortresses of the Big Triangle First. 1986. .
 
 

 Freeman, Roger A. The Mighty Eighth. 1970. .
 Freeman, Roger A. The Mighty Eighth War Diary. 1990. .
 Freeman, Roger A. The Mighty Eighth War Manual. 1991 .
  

 Hamlin John F. and Simons, Graham M. Bassingbourn (Airfield Focus No 2). Bretton, Peterborough, UK: GMS Enterprises, 1992. .
 Havelaar, Marion H., and Hess, William N., The Ragged Irregulars of Bassingbourn: The 91st Bombardment Group in World War II. .

 
  
 Ravenstein, Charles A. (1984). Air Force Combat Wings Lineage and Honors Histories 1947-1977. Maxwell AFB, Alabama: Office of Air Force History. .
 
 
 Rogers, Brian (2005). United States Air Force Unit Designations Since 1978. Hinkley, England: Midland Publications. .

External links

 Stories of the 91st BG
 2484 Squadron Bassingbourn ATC 
 USAAS-USAAC-USAAF-USAF Aircraft Serial Numbers--1908 to present
 Tower Museum Bassingbourn - official site

Royal Air Force stations in Cambridgeshire
Airfields of the VIII Bomber Command in the United Kingdom
Military aviation museums in England
Museums in Cambridgeshire
World War II museums in the United Kingdom